Blacktown Road is a secondary road which links the City of Blacktown to the M4 motorway in Sydney, Australia adjacent to the Great Western Highway.

History
The road forms a part of the Prospect Highway, which is itself an important secondary road linking the Hills District to the M4 Motorway. The road runs from Blacktown's Main Street to the Great Western Highway. On the other side of the Great Western Highway it becomes Clunies Ross Street.

Blacktown Hospital, as well as several home improvement retail-warehouse complexes, are located along Blacktown Road. Several Busways bus routes operate along Blacktown Road, providing access to Blacktown Hospital, Blacktown TAFE and Blacktown railway station.

See also

Streets in Sydney